Lijin Jose is a Malayalam film director with two feature films and one documentary to his credit. His debut movie was Friday starring Fahad Fazil. He is also the founder of Every Dog has its Day Productions (EDHID) and Make My Theatre. He studied filmmaking from C-DIT. His diploma project film, Night Is Difficult to Cut won the best student film award by UGC-CEC. He worked as a paneled director at C-DIT where he made many documentaries, ad films  and public awareness films. Before starting his film career, he also worked as an assistant director with filmmakers V. K. Prakash, T. K. Rajeev Kumar, Deepu Karunakaran, Sunil Kariattukara and Ligy J Pullappally.

Personal life
Lijin was born in Alappuzha, Kerala, India. He did his PG masters in English language and literature from the University of Kerala. He also has a PG diploma in filmmaking from Centre for Development of Imaging Technology (C-DIT).

Career
Lijin Started his film career as an assistant director in 2003. He assisted Ivar, The Journey, Chacko Randaaman, Winter (2004 film) and Seetha Kalyanam. His first film was Friday starring Fahad Fazil and Ann Augustine. He directed Law Point starring Kunchako Boban and Namitha Pramod soon after and focused on making a documentary on the veteran filmmaker, K.G George on his life and career. 8½ Intercuts: Life and Films of K.G. George

Awards and nominations

8½ Intercuts: Life and Films of K.G. George (2017) Documentary

(Indian Panorama, International Film Festival of India (IFFI), International Documentary Short Film Festival of India (IDSFFK), Signs International Film Festival, Prisma International Film Festival)

Unfriend (2014) Malayalam short film

(Official Selection International Documentary Short Film Festival of India (IDSFFK), Signs International Film Festival, Shimla International Film Festival)

Friday (2012) Malayalam feature film

(Official Selection, International Film Festival of Kerala)

Conditions Apply (2010) Malayalam short film

Official Selection-International Documentary Short Film Festival of India (IDSFFK), Signs International Film Festival

Night Is Difficult To Cut (2001) Short film

Best Student Film award by UGC- CEC

Filmography

Short films

References

External links
 
 Lijin Jose
 8½ Intercuts movie review: Astonishingly frank biopic of one of the greatest Indian filmmakers of all time 
8 1/2 Intercuts Documentary Review: A fitting, unbiased tribute to a maverick filmmaker 
 atmanirbhar exposes the existential hazard of treating wives-as doormats 
ഭർത്താവിന് ഭാര്യയുടെ ചാറ്റ്; ഒടുവിൽ ഞെട്ടുന്ന ട്വിസ്റ്റ്; കാണാതെ പോകരുത് 'ആത്മനിർഭർ'...

Malayalam film directors
Living people
Film directors from Kerala
1978 births